Grand Symphony is the fourth album and a studio album from Ricardo Sanchez. Difference Media Group released the album on October 2, 2015.

Critical reception

Awarding the album four stars at CCM Magazine, Andy Argyrakis writes, "Sanchez proves he's just as capable conveying bountiful beats and uplifting messages in the studio environment." Barry Westman, rating the album four and a half stars from Worship Leader, states, "This album is sure to provide something for everyone." Rating the album three and a half stars for New Release Today, Mark Ryan describes, "Grand Symphony of praises to be lifted up to Him in perfect harmony."

Track listing

References

2015 albums